
Gmina Wieliczka is an urban-rural gmina (administrative district) in Wieliczka County, Lesser Poland Voivodeship, in southern Poland.

Villages
Apart from the town of Wieliczka, Gmina Wieliczka contains the villages and settlements of Brzegi, Byszyce, Chorągwica, Czarnochowice, Dobranowice, Golkowice, Gorzków, Grabie, Grabówki, Grajów, Jankówka, Janowice, Kokotów, Koźmice Małe, Koźmice Wielkie, Lednica Górna, Mała Wieś, Mietniów, Pawlikowice, Podstolice, Raciborsko, Rożnowa, Siercza, Śledziejowice, Strumiany, Sułków, Sygneczów, Węgrzce Wielkie and Zabawa.

Neighbouring gminas
Gmina Wieliczka is bordered by the city of Kraków and by the gminas of Biskupice, Dobczyce, Gdów, Niepołomice, Siepraw and Świątniki Górne.

References
Polish official population figures 2006

Wieliczka
Wieliczka County